is a Japanese professional footballer who plays as a centre back for  club Tokyo Verdy.

Career statistics

Club
.

Notes

References

External links
Profile at Tokyo Verdy
Profile at J.League

1999 births
Living people
Association football people from Kanagawa Prefecture
Kokushikan University alumni
Japanese footballers
Japan youth international footballers
Association football defenders
J2 League players
Tokyo Verdy players